Mauro Vaiani-Lisi (born 27 September 1950) is a former Italian male long-distance runner who competed at two editions of the IAAF World Cross Country Championships (1974 and 1975).

See also
 List of Italian records in masters athletics

References

External links
 Mauro Vaiani-Lisi profile at All-Athletics

1950 births
Living people
Italian male long-distance runners
Italian masters athletes
Italian male cross country runners